Zamin Sang (also Romanized as Zamīn Sang) is a village in Shamil Rural District, Takht District, Bandar Abbas County, Hormozgan Province, Iran. At the 2006 census, its population was 1,551, in 314 families.

References 

Populated places in Bandar Abbas County